Manlio Fabio Beltrones Rivera (born August 30, 1952 in Villa Juárez, Sonora) is a Mexican economist and elected official, member of the Partido Revolucionario Institucional (PRI) party, and a federal deputy since September 1, 2012. He was the president of the Senate during its 2006-2007 session and was reelected to that position for the 2010-2011 term. He served as governor of Sonora from October 22, 1991 to September 12, 1997. He served two terms as federal deputy. He was the President of the Chamber of Deputies in 2004-2005. From 2015 to June 2016, he was the president of the Institutional Revolutionary Party.

Career
From an early age, Beltrones entered public life. He joined the PRI at 18, while studying economics at the UNAM. In addition to his electoral posts, he was president of the PRI's state committee in Sonora (Presidente del Comité Directivo Estatal del PRI); Secretary of Government (Secretario de Gobierno); undersecretary of the federal Interior Ministry (Subsecretario de Gobernación) and Secretary General of the PRI's most influential membership branch, Confederación Nacional de Organizaciones Populares, or CNOP.

In 1981, Beltrones married Sylvia Sánchez. The two have one daughter, Sylvana Beltrones Sánchez, a proportional representation federal deputy for the PRI. She is married to Pablo Escudero Morales, a Green Party senator.

At the age of 39, he became governor of his native state. His term was distinguished by construction of public projects in the state, even though the nation was going through a period of austerity. Finances in the state were the first to be audited and certified by professional auditing firms. In Sonora, he is particularly remembered for presiding over the creation of a new charter at the Universidad de Sonora. He has been an advocate of what is called the "new architecture of the Mexican state", a system under which all parties—as well as the Mexican public—have a voice in day-to-day policy-making. Beltrones has stated repeatedly that there can be no "untouchable" topics in Mexico's political arena and that the country deserves and requires a political class that encourages competitive policies that permit the country to prosper.

2012 presidential elections
Since 2010, it was speculated nationwide that he was going to seek his party's nomination for the 2012 presidential election. In 2011 various polls showed Beltrones leading the field of presidential candidates for 2012 Mexican presidential elections. However, on November 20, 2011, he announced that he was not doing so and this paved way for his fellow Institutional Revolutionary Party (PRI)'s president-elected Enrique Peña Nieto. Beltrones was widely expected to become the leader of PRI after its former president controversially stepped down in early December 2011.

Controversy
In 1994, incoming Mexican president Ernesto Zedillo requested that the United States provide his administration with the names of Mexican officials suspected of corruption who should not be considered for positions in the new administration. The United States indicated that Beltrones was suspected of using his power as governor of Sonora to protect drug lord Amado Carrillo Fuentes. Beltrones denied the allegations.

In March 2021 it was revealed that Sylvana Beltrones Sánchez, daughter of Manlio Fabio Beltrones, had deposited USD $10.4 million in the Banca Privada d’Andorra (BPA) in Andorra when she was 26 years old. Now at 38 and a senator, Beltrones Sánchez explained that she and her mother had opened the account to deposit the USD $2.8 million from the sale of apartments in Miami, although she did not explain where the other nearly $8 million came from. In 2015 Andorran judge Canòlich Mingorance secretly investigated the senator, her mother and her father for alleged money laundering. The investigation ended on October 18, 2018 at the request of the PGR.

See also 
 1991, Sonora state election

References

External links
 Manlio Fabio Beltrones official site

1952 births
Governors of Sonora
Members of the Senate of the Republic (Mexico)
Presidents of the Chamber of Deputies (Mexico)
Presidents of the Senate of the Republic (Mexico)
Institutional Revolutionary Party politicians
National Autonomous University of Mexico alumni
Living people
21st-century Mexican politicians
People from Benito Juárez Municipality, Sonora
20th-century Mexican politicians
Politicians from Sonora